Supreme War Council may refer to:
Conseil supérieur de la guerre (1872–1940), highest military authority in the French Third Republic
Supreme War Council (Japan), a permanent war cabinet under the Empire of Japan
Supreme War Council (1917–20), central strategic planning organization of the Allies of World War I
Anglo-French Supreme War Council (1939–40), joint strategic planning council of the Allies of World War II